American Craft is a periodical magazine that documents crafts, craft artists, and both practical and creative aspects of the field of American craft. Originally founded by Aileen Osborn Webb in 1941 as Craft Horizons, the magazine has been published by the nonprofit American Craft Council under the title American Craft since November 1979. 

As of 1979, the magazine's monthly circulation averaged 40,000 copies, making it the main craft publication in the United States. 
As American Craft, the magazine developed "a more visual orientation as a coffee-table magazine". After the National Endowment for the Arts began to award grants to individual craftspeople in 1973, American Craft  profiled major NEA craft recipients.
However, its reviews were often limited to "one or two in-depth commentaries" accompanied by a "visual summary of shows".

Like its predecessor, which both "documented and shaped" the changing history of the American craft movement,
American Craft has reflected the development of craft. 
Writers such as Ed Rossbach have examined the history of craft in its pages. In the 1980s Rossbach wrote a series of articles describing tensions between textile artists Mary Meigs Atwater, Anni Albers, Dorothy Liebes and Marianne Strengell in the 1940s. In 1993, the magazine marked its 50th anniversary and the national "Year of American Craft" with a commemorative issue profiling the previous fifty years.
American Craft was described in 1994 as a "major scholarly periodical" of interest to both researchers and serious craftspeople.

American Crafts current editor is Karen Olson (2020-).
Previous editors-in-chief include 
Deborah Pines, Pat Dandignac,
Lois Moran (1980 to 2006),
Andrew Wagner (2007-2009),
Janet Koplos (guest editor, 2009-2010),
Shannon Sharpe (deputy editor),
Monica Moses (June 2010 to January 2018) and
Megan Guerber (2018-2020).

References

Archives 
 American Craft magazine
 Digital archives for issues of Craft Horizons (1941–1979) and American Craft (1979–1990)

Visual arts magazines published in the United States
Magazines established in 1979
Arts and crafts magazines
Arts and Crafts movement